Shreekrishna Kirtana Kabya or Sri Krishna Kirtana Kabya is a pastoral Vaishnava drama in verse composed by Boru Chandidas. It is considered to be the most significant work after Charyapada in the history of Bengali literature and Mixed Assamese literature. These verses are believed to be written in the pre-Chaitanya era of the later half of 14th century CE.

History of publication
In 1909, Basanta Ranjan Roy Bidvatballava retrieved the punthi (manuscript) of Sri Krishna Kirtana from a shelf in the cowshed of Debendranath Mukhopadhyay, a resident of Kankilya Village, Bankura. Since the punthi was found shorn of its pages including the opening and ending ones, its original name could not be ascertained. A slip inside the punthi reveals that it was initially preserved in the royal library of Bishnupur under the name of Sri Krishna Sandarva. However, the punthi, edited and rechristened as Shreekrishna Kirtana by Bidvatballava, was published by Vangiya Sahitya Parishad in 1916.

Origin
The Sri Krishna Kirtana of Boru Chandidas was deeply influenced by the Vishnu Purana, the popular folk-literature of the period and the Gitagovindam by Jaydeva. The influence of other Puranas like the Padma Purana and the Brahma Vaivarta Purana and the Vaishnava scriptures is also substantial. There is a strong affinity of popular folk literature of the time in the style of the verse. These books are also influenced by Assamese language.  Assamese words such as বাটে বাটে, আছিলা, আই, পেলাইয়া etc. were used in the original book, and the Assamese letter 'ৰ' is also used.

Contents
Sri Krishna Kirtana consists of 418 Bengali padas (verses) and 133 (total 161, 28 shlokas are repeated twice) Sanskrit shlokas, which were also probably composed by the poet. Among these 418 verses, 409 verses have the name of the author in them. The extant work is divided into 13 khandas (sections), namely, Janma (birth), Tamvula (piper betel which was considered as a token of love in that time), Dana (tax-collection), Nauka (boat), Bhara (burden), Vrindavana, Yamuna, Bana (arrow), Vamshi (flute) and Radha Viraha (estrangement of Radha) (the last khanda is not named by the poet). Yamuna khanda is further divided into three sub-sections. The first sub-section is Kaliya Damana khanda (coercion of Kaliya, the snake-demon section), and the third sub-section is Hara khanda (necklace section). The name of the second sub-section has not been found in the manuscript, but its subject matter is Radha's vastraharana (stealing Radha's robes). Bhara Khanda consists of  a sub-section, named Chatra khanda (umbrella section). Three characters, Krishna, Radha and Badayi, the messenger interrelate the plot of the play. Dialogues and counter-dialogues in payar and tripadi meters have added to the dramatic quality of Sri Krishna Kirtana.

Story

Shrikrsnakirtan is a lyrical composition involving Radha and Krishna; its storyline is not based on the Bhagavata Purana, but the popular erotic folk-songs, known as the dhamalis. However, Baru Chandidas managed to add substantial originality, making it a masterpiece of medieval Bengali literature. He gives the yearning of Radha a distinctly Bengali rendition, and in the process captures much of the social conditions of the day.

Notes

External links
 

Bengali-language literature
Vaishnavism
Music of Bengal
Indian styles of music